Devon Teuscher (born 1989) is an American ballet dancer. She is a principal dancer with the American Ballet Theatre.

Early life
Teuscher began her dance training at the age of nine.  As a student, Teuscher attended The Kirov Academy of Ballet, Pacific Northwest Ballet, and American Ballet Theatre’s Summer Intensive. In January 2005, at the age of 15, Teuscher started to study at American Ballet Theatre’s Jacqueline Kennedy Onassis School on full scholarship.

Career
Teuscher joined ABT Studio Company in 2006 where she danced several leading roles. She joined American Ballet Theatre as an apprentice in December 2007 and was promoted to the corps de ballet six months later. She was then promoted to a Soloist in August 2014. Alexei Ratmansky selected Teuscher originate the sole woman in his new work, Serenade after Plato’s Symposium, which debuted in 2016. Teuscher received the Leonore Annenberg Arts Fellowship in 2016. One of Teuscher’s first principle role is Odette/Odile in  Swan Lake, which the New York Times wrote that she was “the complete package, a mixture of astonishing technique, grandeur and ease.”

Teuscher became a Principal Dancer in September 2017. On her debut as Juliet in Romeo and Juliet, The Times called her "a beautiful dancer capable of classicism, repose, lyricism and ardor." Reviewing her performance as Jane Eyre'''s titular role, The Times noted that Teuscher "even standing half a second too long in the pose, even in a “Jane Eyre” that gets lost in the mist — can give off a glow." Teuscher played the role of Myrta in the American Ballet Theatre's Giselle in 2021. In 2023, Teuscher again performed the role of Juliet in Romeo and Juliet performing "flawlessly."

Selected repertoire
Teuscher's repertory with the American Ballet Theatre includes:

Polyhymnia – ApolloA leading role – Bach PartitaNikiya and a Shade – La BayadèreSummer Fairy and Fairy Godmother – CinderellaAurora and Lead Mazurka/Czardas – Coppélia
Medora and Gulnare – Le CorsaireMercedes, the Dryad Queen and a Flower Girl – Don QuixoteThe title role – The FirebirdMyrta – GisellePierrette – HarlequinadeThe title role – Jane EyreCaroline – Jardin aux LilasSpanish Dance and one of the Nutcracker’s Sisters – Alexei Ratmansky’s The NutcrackerJuliet, Rosaline’s friend and Lady Capulet – Romeo and JulietLilac Fairy and Diamond Fairy – Ratmansky’s Sleeping BeautyOdette/Odile, the pas de trois, Spanish Princess and a big swan – Swan LakeTerpsichore and Diana – SylviaPrincess Tea Flower – Whipped CreamSymphonic VariationsTheme and VariationsCreated roles
Fairy Candide (Sincerity) – Alexei Ratmansky’s Sleeping BeautyAfter YouHer NotesI Feel The Earth MoveNew American RomancePraedicereSerenade after Plato’s SymposiumA Time There Was and With a Chance of Rain''

Personal life
Teuscher's partner is Cory Stearns, also a principal dancer at the American Ballet Theatre.

References

External links 
 Devon Teuscher at American Ballet Theatre

1989 births
Living people
American ballerinas
American Ballet Theatre principal dancers
Prima ballerinas
21st-century American ballet dancers
Dancers from Vermont
Jacqueline Kennedy Onassis School alumni
People from South Burlington, Vermont
21st-century American women